Civiasco is a comune (municipality) in the Province of Vercelli in the Italian region Piedmont, located about  northeast of Turin and about  north of Vercelli.

Civiasco borders the following municipalities: Arola, Cesara, Madonna del Sasso, and Varallo Sesia.

People
 Emma Morano (b. 1899–2017), supercentenarian

References

External links
  Official website